Ordrupia is a genus of moths in the family Copromorphidae.

Species
Ordrupia dasyleuca Meyrick, 1926
Ordrupia fabricata Meyrick, 1915
Ordrupia fanniella Busck, 1912
Ordrupia friserella Busck, 1911
Ordrupia macroctenis Meyrick, 1926

References

Natural History Museum Lepidoptera generic names catalog

Copromorphidae